Kjenn is a village in Akershus, Norway. It is situated between the towns of Skårer, Fjellhamar and Langvannet . The village has a kindergarten, Elementary and Secondary schools. 

Villages in Akershus